The Chinese Ambassador to Albania is the official representative of the People's Republic of China to the Republic of Albania.

List of representatives

 September 1954 – May 1957: Xu Yixin
 June 1957 – July 1964: Luo Shigao
 September 1964 – January 1967: Xu Jianguo
 April–September 1967: Liu Xiao
 May 1969 – January 1971: Geng Biao
 February 1971 – May 1976: Liu Zhenhua
 September 1976 – May 1979: Liu Xinquan
 April 1979 – June 1983: Wen Ning
 September 1983 – July 1986: Xi Zhaoming
 September 1986 – October 1989: Fan Chengzuo
 November 1989 – November 1992: Gu Maoxuan
 May 1993 – February 1996: Tao Miaofa
 March 1996 – October 1999: Ma Weimao
 November 1999 – November 2001: Zuo Furong
 December 2001 – September 2007: Tian Changchun
 November 2007 – November 2011: Wang Junling
 December 2011 – March 2015: Ye Hao
 March 2015 – present: Jiang Yu

See also
Sino-Albanian split

References

 
Albania
China